The Beaver Head Light is located high on a bluff on the southern tip of Beaver Island.  Boats trying to navigate North on Lake Michigan need to carefully work their way between Beaver Island and Gray's Reef.

The  cylindrical tower was built in 1858, to replace an 1852 tower. The decagonal lantern room offers panoramic vistas of the Lake.  The tower is open to the public from 8:00 a.m. though 9:00 p.m. during the summer.

In 1866, the attached yellow brick lighthouse keeper's dwelling was constructed.  A frame addition was added to the keepers quarters to accommodate assistant keepers.

In 1915, the  fog signal building was constructed.  Other outbuildings on the grounds including an oil house, garage and storage building and outhouse.

A radio beacon was placed in 1962, at which time the station was decommissioned and declared surplus.  That same year, the original Fourth Order Fresnel lens was removed and placed in the dwelling, where it can still be seen.

In 1975, the Charlevoix Public Schools purchased the site for $1.00.  After some vandalism was incurred, in 1978 the District founded an alternative school for youth aged 16–21.  The school district has operated an Environmental and Vocational Educational Center in the keepers dwelling. Maintenance and restoration of the structure is part of the curriculum. Beginning in 1978, recurrent summer work/study programs greatly restored the station, which was then opened as a school.

In 2003, a grant was obtained to repair spalling of the exterior brick work on the fog signal building. A state grant awarded two years later provided $23,000 for oil house restoration.

The light station is listed on National Register of Historic Places (reference #78001495). It is also on the State List/Inventory.

See also
Beaver Island Harbor Light

Notes

Further reading

 Bibliography on Michigan lighthouses.
 Crompton, Samuel Willard  & Michael J. Rhein, The Ultimate Book of Lighthouses (2002) .
 Hyde, Charles K., and Ann and John Mahan. The Northern Lights: Lighthouses of the Upper Great Lakes. Detroit: Wayne State University Press, 1995. 
 Jones, Ray & Bruce Roberts, American Lighthouses (Globe Pequot, September 1, 1998, 1st Ed.) .
 Jones, Ray, The Lighthouse Encyclopedia, The Definitive Reference (Globe Pequot, January 1, 2004, 1st ed.) .
 Noble, Dennis, Lighthouses & Keepers: U. S. Lighthouse Service and Its Legacy (Annapolis: U. S. Naval Institute Press, 1997. .
 Oleszewski, Wes, Great Lakes Lighthouses, American and Canadian: A Comprehensive Directory/Guide to Great Lakes Lighthouses. Gwinn, Michigan: Avery Color Studios, Inc., 1998. .
 Penrod, John, Lighthouses of Michigan (Berrien Center, Michigan: Penrod/Hiawatha, 1998) .
 
 Putnam, George R., Lighthouses and Lightships of the United States. Boston: Houghton Mifflin Co., 1933).
 United States Coast Guard, Aids to Navigation, (Washington, DC: U. S. Government Printing Office, 1945).
 
 
 Wagner, John L., Michigan Lighthouses: An Aerial Photographic Perspective. East Lansing, Michigan: John L. Wagner, 1998. .
 Wright, Larry; Wright, Patricia, Great Lakes Lighthouses Encyclopedia. Erin: Boston Mills Press, 2006. .

External links

Bartels, Joyse, Beaver Island Head Light history in the Beaver Beacon, June 2, 1904
Clarke Historical Library, Central Michigan University, Bibliography for Charlevoix County
Detroit News, Interactive map on Michigan lighthouses

Lighthouses completed in 1852
Lighthouses completed in 1858
Buildings and structures in Charlevoix County, Michigan
Lighthouses on the National Register of Historic Places in Michigan
Michigan State Historic Sites
Education in Charlevoix County, Michigan
1852 establishments in Michigan
National Register of Historic Places in Charlevoix County, Michigan